The Islamic Courts Union was a legal and political organization formed to address the lawlessness that had gripped Somalia since the fall of the Siad Barre regime in 1991 during the Somali Civil War.

During the early years of the Somali Civil War in Mogadishu, a new phenomenon emerged — the establishment of Sharia courts to impose law and order on various volatile neighborhoods of the city. These independent courts often found their existence being threatened by warlords, which necessitated cooperation between them that would eventually lead to their unification into the entity known as the Islamic Courts Union (ICU) in 2000. Comprising many different courts, the union was a diffuse organization with rivaling leaders sending conflicting messages about the group's goals. Some members had national political ambitions, while others wanted to focus on resolving local disputes and bringing people closer to Islam.

The ICU garnered widespread support among Somalis, who regarded Islam as one of the few remaining trustworthy institutions in the aftermath of the state's collapse. By originating from the grassroots level, asserting their governance under the mantle of religious impartiality and fighting the widely despised warlords controlling much of the city, the ICU rapidly gained the confidence of a populace exhausted by warfare. Given the country's pervasive wartime inter-clan tensions, the ruling of Islamic neutrality presented an alluring option to many Somali citizens.

In the summer of 2006, the ICU decisively defeated a Somali warlord alliance funded by the American Central Intelligence Agency and became the first entity to consolidate control over all of Mogadishu since the collapse of the state in 1991. The period that followed is commonly heralded as the most stable and productive period Somalia had seen up to that point since the outbreak of the civil war. Residents of Mogadishu were finally able to move around the city without fear of attack, the international airport and seaport were opened for the first time in over a decade, a massive rubbish clean up campaign was started and there was a significant reduction of arms on the streets. Six months into their reign, the Islamic Courts Union would be toppled during the final days of 2006 by an Ethiopian-led military intervention, supported by the United States. The organization would completely dissolve early in 2007 due to the invasion and internal disagreements. The 2006–2009 War in Somalia that followed would consequently bring internationally recognized Transitional Federal Government (TFG) to power. 

Following the foreign intervention by Ethiopian forces in late 2006, most of the moderates governing the ICU would seek refuge abroad. Consequently, a radical militia of the Islamic Courts, the now-infamous Al-Shabaab stayed behind and invoked jihad against the American backed Ethiopian invasion, greatly empowering themselves as a resistance movement. High-ranking members of the Islamic Courts would later found the Alliance for the Re-liberation of Somalia in late 2007, which would later merge with the TFG. Former chairman of the Islamic Courts Union, Sharif Sheikh Ahmed, became president of Somalia in 2009, replacing successfully the Transitional Government with the Federal Government of Somalia. In 2012, the country adopted a new constitution that declared Somalia an Islamic state with Sharia as its primary source of law.

Origins 

The Islamic courts were not the first attempt to use Islam to quell the growing disorder in Somalia. Just before the full outbreak of the Somali Civil War, a group of sixty highly prominent members of Somali society under the banner of "Islamic Call" published a public manifesto addressed to President Mohammed Siad Barre. The manifesto warned that he had committed serious transgressions against the laws of Islam and called for him to peacefully step down and transition power, but their attempts were unsuccessful.

First Sharia Courts 
The first attempts to use Islamic law (Sharia) to build local stability began sometime in 1992, in the northern part of the Mogadishu. Around this time, several well-known Somali scholars such as Sheikh Sharif Sharafow, Sheikh Ibrahim Suley and Sheikh Mohamed Moallin Hassan established Sharia courts in an attempt to address the lawlessness that had erupted following the collapse of the state. The first Shari'a courts were started on a very small local neighborhood level by Somali religious leaders as a way to address issues in their communities. Most problems they dealt with were related to petty crimes and family disputes. In the chaotic political context of war torn Mogadishu the religious leaders were considered by most Somalis as some of the only people who could be trusted to impartially resolve disputes. Importantly, the courts also did not take positions on national-political or clan affairs, lending significant credence to their purported impartiality.

At the same time as the creation of the Mogadishu courts, Sheikh Mohamed Haji Yusuf and Sheikh Mohamud A. Nur established a new Islamic court in the Luuq district of Gedo region in 1992. The court had more success than its counter parts in Mogadishu and consequently Luuq district was the safest area in Somalia during much of the 1990s. The court dissolved in 1997 when the Somali National Front and Ethiopian military collaborated to topple it.

The Sheikh Ali-Dhere court 
In 1994, the opening of a court in Mogadishu run by a Sheikh named Ali Dheere would have a significant impact on the expansion of the Sharia courts system in the city. Dheere, who lived in one of the most dangerous regions of war-torn Mogadishu, became exhausted with the growing anarchy. He decided to put his religious training to use by setting up the first major Sharia court in Somalia. The infamous "Siisii Street" ran through his community and became notorious for its dangerous reputation.

Primarily his court focused on aiding merchants and store owners resolve their disputes, helping people arrange legal agreements for large purchases like homes, and trying people for crimes. Local scholars, elders, businessmen and political leaders cooperated with Dheere in a bid to end the spiraling chaos in their community. Soon Ali Dheere had a staff that would apprehend bandits and thieves in the area and bring them to be put on trial. His success in bringing order to his neighborhood in Mogadishu became well-known through out the city and led to the establishment of other copycat Sharia courts.

The court did not shy away from strict punishments and even carried out executions. Soon word began rapidly spreading that law and order was being established in Dheeres sector of the city and the crime rate in the area subsequently dropped dramatically.

Rise of the Mogadishu Islamic Courts 
In 1994 and 1995 other Sharia courthouses began opening up in northern Mogadishu, operating independently in their own self contained jurisdictions in the city. Before the establishment of these courts, acts of rape had become commonplace in north Mogadishu since 1991. The establishment of the judiciary made a considerable impact on the security situation as the courts made a point of handing out the capital punishment of stoning to rapists. By 1997 there had been seven cases of executions by stoning's in Somalia. It has been noted that suppression of war time sexual violence was a major underlying factor in Somali women’s support for the Islamic Courts.  

The first court did not start in southern Mogadishu until 1998, as the de facto ruler of the territory, General Mohammed Farah Aidid and his faction the Somali National Alliance opposed the Islamic courts, and no progress occurred until after Aidids death. Ali Mahdi, Aidids prime rival controlling the northern part of the city, would issue a decree to dismantle Ali Dheere's Court after perceiving the Sheikhs rising popularity as a threat to his own authority. As the years passed, with nothing but warlords offering to replace its authority, the rule of the sharia courts began to cement.

By 1999 the multiple Islamic courts had jurisdiction over much of the south of the city as well and five active Sharia courts were operating in the region. The courts were not an organized movement or a government, but represented the closest thing Somalia had to either. Their influence was enhanced by financial donors abroad who sought to bring any semblance of stability to the country. While many Somalis voiced disapproval of the more fundamentalist ways of the original Sharia courts, it was noted that most felt that they were well organized and effective civil administrators.

Consolidation and formation of the Islamic Courts Union 
In April 1999 numerous Sharia courts came together for the first time and jointly seized control of Mogadishu's Bakara Market from the warlords and later that year made a successful united effort to push numerous warlords to the outskirts of Mogadishu, though the courts did not have control over the entire city. 

In 2000, after clearing much of Mogadishu from control of the warlords, eleven separate Sharia courts in the city would finally merge to form the Islamic Courts Union. Professor Mark Fathi Massoud notes that the turn that Somalis made in the late '90s and early 2000s towards establishing local religious courts for self-governance and then linking them into a system mirrored the same patterns of early democratic Western Europe and colonial North America, where state-building relied upon courts, and judges invoking will of God. He also notes that, "In using religion to build stability, the Sharia courts bear striking parallels to those courts that played an influential role in the early development of democratic states."

When the Transitional National Government of Somalia was established in Djibouti during the spring of 2000 the momentum of the ICU was slowed. It would not return until it was revived in 2004 by Sheikh Sharif Sheikh Ahmed who was subsequently elected as chairman of the ICU. The year before in 2003, Sheikh Sharif Ahmed had been a school teacher that had become frustrated with the return of insecurity in north Mogadishu and successfully pushed to rejuvenate the Islamic Courts system in the region.

Rise of the Transitional Federal Government 
Following the failure of the Transitional National Government of Somalia established in 2000, the Transitional Federal Government (TFG) led by Abdullahi Yusuf was formed in 2004. Yusuf was a previous close ally of Ethiopia and the Ethiopian government in return strongly backed his leadership. Its backing of Yusuf reported to be instrumental in his victory for the TFG leadership during the election held in Kenya.

The TFG operated entirely outside of Somalia due to instability in Mogadishu and consequently was criticized by Somali citizens and international community. At the time the TFG was only recognized by Kenya and Ethiopia, as the European Union, the United States and other members of the international community refused to fully recognize the TFG's legitimacy until it operated from Mogadishu. To counter this, the TFG moved into Somalia for the first time in 2005, eventually setting up its headquarters south west of Mogadishu in Baidoa.

ICU and War on Terror

ICU-Warlord Conflict 
During 2005 Mogadishu was hit by a significant wave of unexplained assassinations and disappearances. The Islamic Courts claimed that covert US government operations and warlords were targeting high ranking ICU officials. According to C. Barnes & H. Hassan, "It was in this context that a military force known as Al-Shabaab (‘the Youth’) emerged, related to but seemingly autonomous of the broad based Courts movement." At the time it was widely believed in Mogadishu that Somali warlords were cooperating with U.S. intelligence agents to kidnap alleged terror suspects, particularly prominent religious leaders. This atmosphere forced the ICU to take a more confrontational stance against the warlords. Full hostilities between the two parties would break out soon after over the issue of controlling Mogadishu's highly profitable makeshift El Ma’an port. The ICU would enjoy widespread support from Mogadishu citizens and business community against the warlords, greatly aiding its ability to seize and control large swathes of the city.

CIA intervention 
The Bush administration had become increasingly concerned with the growing power of the Islamic Courts Union, and feared that they would make Somalia a haven for Al-Qaeda to plan attacks from, like in Afghanistan. The Americans would go on to approve funding for the Somali warlords and actively encourage them to counter the ICU, a decision made by top officials in Washington which would be later reaffirmed by the U.S. National Security Council during meeting about Somalia in March 2006. At the time of the meeting there was fierce fighting in between the warlords and the Islamic Courts around Mogadishu, and the decision was taken to make counterterrorism the top policy priority for Somalia.

At the suggestion of the Central Intelligence Agency (CIA), anti-ICU warlords united under the banner of the Alliance for the Restoration of Peace and Counter-Terrorism (ARPCT) and according by the International Crisis Group, had a notorious pattern of seizing innocent clerics with little or no intelligence value, which greatly fed into the already existing perception among Somalis that the Americans and the warlords were waging a war against Islam under the guise of the War on Terrorism.

According to Mary Harper, a journalist with BBC Africa, the Islamic Courts Union was in reality more of a loose federation and only began to unite into a homogenous body with a clear authority when its existence was threatened by the ARPCT. By this time there were 11 courts within the union.

The Transitional Federal Government of Somalia, being both in contention with the ICU and backed by the United States, openly opposed the Americans operation to fund the warlords. Nine of Mogadishu's most prominent community leaders that opposed the ICU claim they secretly flew to neighboring Djibouti in early March 2006 and pleaded with U.S. military officials there to stop funding the warlords who were devastating the city. They allege that they warned the Americans that backing the hated warlords would end up greatly empowering the Islamic Courts and inflame the radical elements within it.

American support for the warlords extended to the point where, on numerous occasions, Nairobi-based CIA officers would land on warlord-controlled airstrips in Mogadishu with large amounts of money for distribution to Somali militias. According to John Prendergast, CIA-operated flights into Somalia had been bringing in $100,000 to $150,000 USD per month for the warlords and he further claimed that the flights would remain in Somalia for the day so that CIA agents can confer with them. The CIA also gave its newfound allies surveillance equipment for "tracking al Qaeda suspects". A United Nations report on violations of the international arms embargo on Somalia claimed that the Ethiopian government had armed warlord Mohamed Dheere to fight the ICU.

According to multiple U.S. officials, the decision to use of the warlords as proxies was born from fears of once again committing large numbers of American soldiers to Somalia following the disastrous 1993 Battle of Mogadishu. Many of the warlords the Americans would fund to fight the Islamic Courts Union were many of the same ones that had fought directly against the Americans in Mogadishu during UNOSOM II in 1993.

By April 2006 much of Mogadishu had fallen under the control of the ICU. The cities air and seaports came under the organizations direct control for the first time. In May the ICU would seize the very building where the warlord alliance had been founded and established an Islamic Court in it's place.

Defeat of the warlord alliance and seizure of Mogadishu 

On June 5, 2006, the Islamic Courts Union decisively defeated the warlord alliance in the Second Battle of Mogadishu, gained total authority over the capital and proceeded to establish a 65-mile radius of control around the city. This was a seminal moment in modern Somali history, as the ICU was now the first group to have consolidated control over all of Mogadishu since the collapse of the Somali state. According to Chatham House, "The Courts achieved the unthinkable, uniting Mogadishu for the first time in 16 years, and re-establishing peace and security". BBC News reported that the ICU had emerged as Somalia's strongest and most popular faction.

Over the next few months the Islamic Courts embarked on a campaign to stabilize the city. On 15 July 2006, Mogadishu International Airport, which had been closed since the withdrawal of the international forces in 1995, reopened. The ICU organized a clean-up campaign for the streets of Mogadishu on 20 July 2006. This was the first time litter and rubbish had been collected in the entire city since it collapsed into chaos over a decade earlier. On the 25 August they also reopened the historic seaport of Mogadishu, which had been one of the busiest in ports in all of East Africa. Another action that significantly increased the ICU's popularity was the restoration of proper ownership regarding land and homes that had been lost or stolen during the civil war. It was noted that as that courts had taken over the city many people had simply left the homes they occupied before the rightful owners had even taken their cases to the specialized Sharia courts that had been setup for property disputes.

During this period the ICU also began to expand its authority by validating major transactions such as the purchase of vehicles or homes and overseeing marriages and divorces. The courts would go on to create a coast guard to combat the growing phenomena of piracy in Somalia, and were able to successfully curb its rise during their rule. Top UN officials have referred to this period as a 'Golden era''' in the history of Somali politics. 

The Alliance for the Restoration of Peace and Counter-Terrorism soon collapsed, with the majority of its commanders publicly resigning or expressing support for the ICU. Two of the defeated warlords allegedly fled to an American naval vessel off the Somali coast according to witnesses in Mogadishu.

 ICU offensive, deployment of Ethiopian troops and First Khartoum ICU/TFG talks 

With its newfound position of authority, the ICU seized on its popularity and began pushing deep into the regions surrounding the city for the first time. Their offensive capability was greatly aided by new weaponry it had captured from the warlords – most of which had been bought with U.S. funds. During the summer of 2006, the ICU was allegedly being given support by Eritrea, Djibouti, Iran, Libya, Egypt, Saudi Arabia and Syria.

During the ICU's brief control of southern Somalia, the organization made numerous declarations condemning discrimination against "oppressed clans" (e.g., Yibir, Jareer and Madhibaan) as un-Islamic. The courts deliberately orchestrated marriages between women from discriminated groups to men from larger Somali clans in order to challenge popular perceptions.

 First deployment of Ethiopian forces 
On 17 June, local Somali officials and residents in Gedo region reported about 50 Ethiopian armored vehicles had passed through the border town of Dolow and pushed 50 km inland near the town of Luuq.

ICU head Sheik Sharif Sheik Ahmed would claim that 300 Ethiopian troops had entered the country through the border town of Dolow in Gedo region that morning in support of the TFG, and that Ethiopian forces had also been probing Somali border towns. He would go on to threaten to fight Ethiopian troops if they continued intervening and further stated, “We want the whole world to know what’s going on. The United States is encouraging Ethiopia to take over the area. Ethiopia has crossed our borders and are heading for us.” The Ethiopian government would deny the deployment of its forces in Somalia and countered that the ICU was marching towards its borders. The TFG would deny accusations of an Ethiopian military deployment counter claiming that ICU was fabricating a pretext to assault its capital in Baidoa. 

On June 24, Hassan Dahir Aweys would be named head of the ICUs newly formed 88 member parliament, the Council of the Islamic Courts.

 Khartoum ICU/TFG conference 
The TFG, overshadowed by the recent achievements of the ICU, was in dire need of the popularity and military capacity of the courts and the ICU in turn was in dire need of international recognition along with the political and administrative skills required to run a government that the TFG possessed. The obvious deficiencies of both organizations led many to perceive a possible complimentary ICU/TFG amalgamation. In light of this, the Arab League arranged a conference between the ICU and TFG in June 2006 to discuss merger proposals in Khartoum, Sudan. The talk initially began positively but rapidly collapsed over the issue of Ethiopian forces deployed to Somalia at the request of the TFG. The ICU insisted that the presence of Ethiopian forces was the priority and should be dealt with first, while the TFG insisted that an agreement on a unified government had to be made before removing the Ethiopian presence. Neither side was willing to compromise on the issue of Ethiopian troops, leading to the collapse of the talks. On 22 June, 2006 a communique was issued announcing that both parties recognized each others legitimacy and that neither would engage in hostile propaganda against the other.

Both parties agreed to renew talks and meet again on 17 July, 2006.

 Second Khartoum ICU/TFG talks, intervention and Baidoa Bombing 
The TFG was alarmed by the rapid territorial expansion of the ICU and feared that it was attempting to encircle its capital in Baidoa. Neither party was willing to go to Khartoum for the second planned conference. The TFG insisted that the ICU withdraw to the territory it had occupied during the June conference, while the ICU demanded the withdrawal of Ethiopian military contingents in Somalia before discussions resumed. The two primary mediators, the Arab League and the Intergovernmental Authority on Development (IGAD) were both viewed as biased by the ICU and TFG. The ICU accused the IGAD of being partial to the TFG, while the TFG accused the Arab League of complicity with the ICU.

The ICU continued to gain territory around Baidoa and lacking any troops of its own the TFG requested foreign support. On 20 July, 2006 Ethiopia deployed hundreds of troops to Baidoa. This prompted an immediate warning from Sheik Sharif Sheik Ahmed that the organization would invoke a jihad against Ethiopian forces if they did not withdraw. Numerous Somali witnesses and a BBC correspondent reported seeing Ethiopian Army trucks and hundreds of soldiers crossing the border and entering Baidoa. The TFG would publicly deny the existence of Ethiopian forces in Baidoa and argued the claims were ICU propaganda. TFG minister of information Mohammed Abdi Hayir, claimed that sightings of Ethiopian forces in Somalia were a result of confused identity as Ethiopia had merely provided 4,000 uniforms to TFG forces. Ethiopian minister of information, Berhan Hailu announced soon after the deployment, “We will use all means at our disposal to crush the Islamist group if they attempt to attack Baidoa, the seat of the Transitional Federal Government.”''

Eventually talks did resume, but in September instead of July 2006. Negotiations quickly broke down over the issues of Ethiopian forces and ICU expansion. According to former Somali diplomat and writer Ismail Ali Ismail, the failure of the second Khartoum talks stemmed from incompetent mediation, as he argues that the roadblock could have been resolved if the mediators had suggested and pushed for a simultaneous withdrawal of both ICU and Ethiopian forces under international supervision.

September 2006 Baidoa Suicide Bombing and capture of Kismayo 
On 18 September, 2006 the first suicide bombing in Somali history occurred in the TFG capital of Baidoa, when a truck loaded with explosives attempted to assassinate President Abdullahi Yusuf. Previous attacks on the TFG had been blamed on warlords, but the government would for the first time accuse radical elements within the ICU of the attack. The ICU would deny responsibility for the assassination attempt, instead pinning the blame on Ethiopian provocateurs. According to Professor Robert Pape of the University of Chicago, the decision to invite Ethiopian troops to invade Somalia created an ideal trigger for extremists to carry out Somalia's first ever suicide attack, as the deployment of foreign troops loyal to the Christian-dominated government in Ethiopia was viewed by the majority of ordinary Somali citizens as a threat to the nations sovereignty.

On 25 September the ICU would seize the strategic port city of Kismayo, which the TFG claimed breached the ceasefire deal signed between the two parties in Khartoum.

Criticism of ICU rule 
Despite its significant achievements, the ICU would attract criticism for many of its actions.

Extremist elements in ICU, who viewed the TFG as an Ethiopian puppet, would engage in assassinations of TFG personnel.

Somalia's only popular drug, Khat, was outright banned. During the civil war many Somalis had relied the selling and distribution of the drug as one of their sole sources of income and consequently the ban had serious repercussions on people's ability to afford basic necessities. Charcoal exports were banned, on account of the industry devastating Somalia's fragile environment. Once again many Somalis had relied on the practice to make ends meet.

There was serious ideological friction between the ‘moderate’ wing of the Islamic Courts led by the Chairman of the Islamic Courts’ "Executive Council", Sheikh Sharif, and the "radical" wing led by the Chairman of the Courts’ Shura (Consultative or Legislative Council), Sheikh Aweys. These ideological divisions became clear when various wings of the Islamic Courts started making policies and statements without reference to the collective leadership. Many of them – mostly "radically" conservative social policies – were not popular among the wider population.

Many Somali citizens criticized the courts for handing out punishments to petty criminals far more frequently than powerful gangsters and warlords.

Ethiopian invasion and downfall 

To avoid turning Mogadishu into a warzone once again, the ICU withdrew from the city on December 26, 2006.

The top leaders of the Islamic Courts Union, including Sheikh Hassan Dahir Aweys, Sheikh Sharif Sheikh Ahmed and Sheikh Abdirahman Janaqow, resigned the next day.

On January 1, 2007, the ICU would abandon its last urban stronghold in the city of Kismayo, far south of Mogadishu and the remaining leadership would flee to Eritrea.

Following the Ethiopian invasion and subsequent occupation, the Islamic Courts Union disbanded and Somalia once again began slipping into a state of chaos. Between 2007 and 2008 approximately two-thirds of Mogadishu's residents would be forced to flee the growing violence in the city, and Somalia began to experience one of the worst humanitarian crises in its history.

Somalia after the ICU

The Islamic Courts Union had actively fought pirate activity on the Somali coast, and consequently piracy would thrive in their wake.

Al Shabaab, an obscure organization at this point, would gain immense popularity as a resistance group fighting against the Ethiopians. Consequently much of Somalia south of Mogadishu would become Al Shabaab ruled territory.

Creations of the Alliance for the Re-Liberation of Somalia and merger with TFG 

In September 2007 the successor to the Islamic Courts Union, the Alliance for the Re-Liberation of Somalia (ARS), was founded by numerous high ranking ICU officials who had south refuge in Eritrea. Sheikh Sharif Ahmed would be elected head of the organization and promptly declared war on Ethiopian forces. The ARS further announced its refusal to hold talks with the TFG until an Ethiopian withdrawal.

In June 2008 the ARS and TFG would sign a peace accord agreeing to the cessation of all hostilities between the two parties. Though successful, the talks were once again threatened by the issue of Ethiopian military forces deployed in Somalia.

See also 
African Union Mission to Somalia

Notes and references 

Factions in the Somali Civil War
Islamic Courts of Somalia
Law of Somalia
Islamic Courts of Somalia
Islam in Somalia
Islamic courts and tribunals